A constitutional referendum was held in Guinea on 23 December 1990. The new constitution was approved by 98.7% of voters, with a turnout of 97.4%.

Results

References

1990
1990 referendums
1990 in Guinea
Constitutional referendums